This is a list of mayors of Sierre in canton of Valais, Switzerland. The city of Sierre is governed by a nine-member executive chaired by the mayor.

Sierre
Mayors of Sierre, List
Sierre